Seiki (written: , , , , ,  or ) is a masculine Japanese given name. Notable people with the name include:

, Japanese football and manager
Seiki Kayamori (1877–1941), Japanese photographer
, pseudonym of Kuroda Kiyoteru, Japanese painter and teacher
, Japanese judoka
, Japanese golfer
, Japanese boxer
, Japanese writer
, Japanese professional wrestler

Japanese masculine given names